Samanta Karavella (born 9 July 1990) is an Albanian singer and songwriter.

Life and career

1990–2012: Early life and career beginnings 

Samanta Karavella was born on 9 July 1990 into an Albanian family in the city of Tirana, then part of the People's Republic of Albania. Showing an interest in music from a very young age, Karavella began dedicating herself to music when she was 13 as she auditioned for the Albanian talent show . At age 16, she had a cameo role in the film Gjoleka.

2013–present: Mama and continued success 

In 2013, Karavella emerged as the winner of the 10th edition of Top Fest with the song "". Starting with the release of "Ti s'e din se" in July 2014, it received a nomination at the 2015 Netët e Klipit Shqiptar gala in Ulcinj, Montenegro. Finishing in fourth place, Karavella also received the Best Ballad Award at the contest. In January 2019, she released "", a collaboration with Kosovo-Albanian musician Elinel, which incorporated R&B and hip hop elements into its sound. In the course of 2020, "" and "NKN" featuring Kosovo-Albanian singer, peaked at numbers 19 and 34 in her native country, respectively. Released in May 2021, Karavella's follow-up single "" reached number seven in Albania. Starting with the release of "Mala" in July, the single's official remix, "Mala (naBBoo RMX)", received airplay in the Commonwealth of Independent States (CIS) and was licensed by the Russian subsidiary of Warner Music in December 2021.

Karavella's debut studio album, Mama, is currently under development. Released as its lead single, "Mama" reached its peak at number 19 on the native top 100 chart in November 2021, and was followed by the album's second single, "", a month later.

Artistry 

Karavella's music style is often regarded as electric with various other styles of musical influences such as ethnic pop and R&B.

Discography

Albums 
 Mama

Singles

As lead artist

References

External links 

1990 births
21st-century Albanian women singers
Albanian pop singers
Albanian rhythm and blues singers
Albanian songwriters
Festivali i Këngës contestants
Living people
Musicians from Tirana